Julostylis polyandra is a species of flowering plant in the family Malvaceae. It is found only in India.

References

Hibisceae
Endemic flora of India (region)
Endangered plants
Taxonomy articles created by Polbot